Calloideae is a monotypic subfamily of flowering plants in the family Araceae. The single genus in the subfamily is Calla, although in the past under Engler's description of Araceae it included four genera, namely Lysichiton, Symplocarpus, Orontium, and Calla. The subfamily was subsequently made monotypic and given a single tribe, Calleae. Species in Calloideae are often found in marshy habitats in the northern hemisphere. Trichosclereids are not found in the flowers.

References

 French, J.C. and Tomlinson, P.B. (1981). Vascular Patterns in Stems of Araceae: Subfamilies Calloideae and Lasioideae. Botanical Gazette, Vol. 142, No. 3 (Sep., 1981), pp. 366–381.
 Bogner, Josef and Nicolson, Dan H. (1991). A Revised Classification of Araceae with Dichotomous Keys. Willdenowia, Bd. 21, H. 1/2 (Dec. 11, 1991), pp. 35–50.
 Bown, Deni (2000). Aroids: Plants of the Arum Family [ILLUSTRATED]. Timber Press. 

Araceae
Alismatales subfamilies
Monotypic plant taxa
Historically recognized angiosperm taxa